Elisabeth Corvinus or Elisabeth Hunyadi (21 December 1496 – Gyula, Hungary, 1508) Princess of Hungary and the last surviving member of the Hungarian Royal House of Hunyadi.

Life

Her father was János Corvinus, an illegitimate son of King Matthias I. Her mother was Beatrice de Frangepan, the member of a famous Croatian noble family, the Frankopans. Her brother was Christopher, last male member of the Royal House of Hunyadi. After her father's death in 1504, she and her brother were tied to their mother's apron-strings, but Prince Christopher died soon and the royal house was extinct in male line, because he was its last surviving male member. It was rumoured that he had been poisoned. Elisabeth also died soon without issue, and the extinction of the Royal House became total.

Footnotes

Bibliography
Schönherr, Gyula: Hunyadi Corvin János (János Corvinus Hunyadi), Franklin-Társulat, Budapest, 1894 URL: See External Links

External links
Schönherr, Gyula: János Corvinus Hunyadi (1473-1504)

Hunyadi family
1496 births
1508 deaths
15th-century Hungarian women
15th-century Hungarian people
16th-century Hungarian people
16th-century Hungarian women